Shane Broadway (born August 30, 1972) is a former Democratic state legislator, serving in the Arkansas General Assembly from 1997 to 2011 with a focus on education policy. Following an unsuccessful bid for Arkansas Lieutenant Governor in 2010, Broadway served as interim director of the Arkansas Department of Higher Education, and is currently the Vice President for University Relations at the Arkansas State University System in Little Rock.

Personal life and education
Broadway was born in Benton to parents Charles and Bertha Broadway on August 30, 1972. He attended Bryant High School in Central Arkansas, graduating in 1990. He attended Arkansas State University in Jonesboro, graduating with a bachelor's degree in political science in 1994 and receiving the Robert E. Lee Wilson Award and the Distinguished Service Award. Broadway married the former Debbie Tableriou in a ceremony at the Arkansas State Capitol in March 1996.

Career

Politics
Broadway was elected to the Arkansas House of Representatives in 1996, serving until 2002. He became Speaker of the Arkansas House during his tenure. Broadway was elected to the Arkansas Senate in 2002 and was re-elected in 2006.

In 2010, Broadway ran for Lieutenant Governor of Arkansas, but lost by two points to Mark Darr. Broadway was endorsed by Mike Beebe, who won reelection in the 2010 Arkansas gubernatorial election.

Education
Beebe appointed Broadway as director of the Arkansas Department of Higher Education a few months later. The Republican legislature objected to Broadway's nomination as he didn't meet the requirement as "an experienced educator in the field of higher education" according to the law. Broadway's successor in the Senate, Jeremy Hutchinson, unsuccessfully sought to change the requirement to allow Broadway to fill the post. Broadway remained interim director until taking a position with the Arkansas State University System in 2013. The requirement was later changed when Asa Hutchinson nominated Johnny Key, who also lacked experience as an educator, in 2015.

References

External links
Project Vote Smart page
Twitter account

Living people
Arkansas State University alumni
Businesspeople from Arkansas
Democratic Party members of the Arkansas House of Representatives
Democratic Party Arkansas state senators
1972 births